Huyett may refer to:

Daniel Henry Huyett III (1921–1998), United States federal judge
Huyett, Maryland (also known as Huyetts Crossroads), unincorporated community in western Washington County, Maryland, United States

See also
Houyet